Gerardo Priego Tapia (born 19 June 1965) is a Mexican economist and politician from the National Action Party. From 2006 to 2009, he served as Deputy of the LX Legislature of the Mexican Congress representing Tabasco.

References

1965 births
Living people
People from Villahermosa
Monterrey Institute of Technology and Higher Education alumni
Mexican economists
National Action Party (Mexico) politicians
21st-century Mexican politicians
Politicians from Tabasco
Deputies of the LX Legislature of Mexico
Members of the Chamber of Deputies (Mexico) for Tabasco